The 1997 Anaheim Angels season involved the Angels finishing 2nd in the American League West with a record of 84 wins and 78 losses.  It was the first season for the franchise as the "Anaheim Angels", after playing under the name of the "California Angels" for the previous 31 seasons, plus part of another.

Offseason
 October 28, 1996: Chili Davis was traded by the Angels to the Kansas City Royals for Mike Bovee and Mark Gubicza.
 November 12, 1996: Todd Van Poppel was selected off waivers by the Anaheim Angels from the Detroit Tigers.
 November 26, 1996: J. T. Snow was traded by the Anaheim Angels to the San Francisco Giants for Allen Watson and Fausto Macey (minors).
 December 5, 1996: Jim Leyritz was traded by the New York Yankees to the Anaheim Angels for players to be named later. The Anaheim Angels sent Jeremy Blevins (minors) (December 9, 1996) and Ryan Kane (minors) (December 9, 1996) to the New York Yankees to complete the trade.
 December 6, 1996: Craig Grebeck was signed as a free agent with the Anaheim Angels.
 March 26, 1997: Todd Van Poppel was released by the Anaheim Angels.
March 31, 1997: Jim Abbott was released by the Anaheim Angels.

Regular season
 June 17, 1997: The first interleague game between the Anaheim Angels and the Los Angeles Dodgers took place at Dodger Stadium. The rivalry would be known as the Freeway Series. The Dodgers won the game by a score of 4-3.

Notable transactions
May 18, 1997: Tony Phillips was traded by the Chicago White Sox with Chad Kreuter to the Anaheim Angels for Chuck McElroy and Jorge Fábregas.
June 3, 1997: Matt Wise was drafted by the Anaheim Angels in the 6th round of the 1997 amateur draft. Player signed June 8, 1997.
July 10, 1997: Greg Cadaret was signed as a free agent with the Anaheim Angels.
July 29, 1997: Jim Leyritz was traded by the Anaheim Angels with a player to be named later to the Texas Rangers for Ken Hill. The Anaheim Angels sent Rob Sasser (October 31, 1997) to the Texas Rangers to complete the trade.
 August 13, 1997: Rickey Henderson was traded by the San Diego Padres to the Anaheim Angels for a player to be named later, Ryan Hancock, and Stevenson Agosto (minors). The Anaheim Angels sent George Arias (August 19, 1997) to the San Diego Padres to complete the trade.

Season standings

Record vs. opponents

Roster

Game log

Regular season

|- style="background:#cfc;"
| 3 || April 4 || 7:06p.m. PDT || Indians || W 8–6  || || || || 4:12 || 17,758 || 2–1 || W2
|- style="background:#fcc;"
| 4 || April 5 || 7:05p.m. PDT || Indians || L 5–7 || || || || 3:09 || 23,913 || 2–2 || L1
|- style="background:#fcc;"
| 5 || April 6 || 5:05p.m. PDT || Indians || L 8–10 || || || || 3:24 || 29,363 || 2–3 || L2
|- style="background:#fcc;"
| 6 || April 7 || 7:05p.m. PDT || Yankees || L 3–5 || || || || 3:24 || 16,514 || 2–4 || L3
|- style="background:#cfc;"
| 7 || April 8 || 7:05p.m. PDT || Yankees || W 10–9  || || || || 4:18 || 17,202 || 3–4 || W1
|- style="background:#fcc;"
| 8 || April 9 || 7:35p.m. PDT || Yankees || L 5–12 || || || || 2:52 || 19,242 || 3–5 || L1
|- style="background:#fcc;"
| 9 || April 11 || 10:05a.m. PDT || @ Indians || L 3–15 || || || || 3:12 || 42,643 || 3–6 || L2
|- style="background:#bbb;"
|–|| April 12 || || @ Indians || colspan="8"|Postponed (Rain) (Makeup date: July 28)
|- style="background:#cfc;"
| 10 || April 13 || 10:05a.m. PDT || @ Indians || W 8–3 || || || || 3:29 || 41,218 || 4–6 || W1
|- style="background:#cfc;"
| 11 || April 14 || 4:35p.m. PDT || @ Yankees || W 5–1 || || || || 2:40 || 15,082 || 5–6 || W2
|- style="background:#cfc;"
| 12 || April 15 || 4:35p.m. PDT || @ Yankees || W 6–5 || || || || 3:49 || 16,944 || 6–6 || W3
|-

|- style="background:#bbb;"
|–|| May 2 || || @ White Sox || colspan="8"|Postponed (Rain) (Makeup date: May 3)
|- style="background:#cfc;"
| 24  || May 3 || || @ White Sox
|- style="background:#fcc;"
| 25  || May 3 || || @ White Sox
|- style="background:#fcc;"
| 26 || May 4 || || @ White Sox
|- style="background:#cfc;"
| 28 || May 5 || 4:36p.m. PDT || @ Orioles || W 7–2 || || || || 3:00 || 41,296 || 14–14 || W1
|- style="background:#fcc;"
| 29 || May 6 || 4:37p.m. PDT || @ Orioles || L 4–8 || || || || 2:43 || 37,150 || 14–15 || L1
|- style="background:#fcc;"
| 30 || May 7 || 4:37p.m. PDT || @ Orioles || L 0–3 || || || || 2:43 || 43,858 || 14–16 || L2
|- style="background:#cfc;"
| 34 || May 12 || || White Sox
|- style="background:#cfc;"
| 35 || May 13 || || White Sox
|- style="background:#cfc;"
| 36 || May 14 || 7:35p.m. PDT || Orioles || W 6–5 || || || || 2:55 || 15,780 || 17–19 || W3
|- style="background:#cfc;"
| 37 || May 15 || 7:06p.m. PDT || Orioles || W 3–2 || || || || 2:58 || 15,966 || 18–19 || W4
|- style="background:#fcc;"
| 41 || May 19 || 7:05p.m. PDT || Mariners || L 4–13 || || || || 3:08 || 17,279 || 21–20 || L1
|- style="background:#cfc;"
| 42 || May 20 || 7:05p.m. PDT || Mariners || W 11–9 || || || || 3:27 || 17,492 || 22–20 || W1
|- style="background:#cfc;"
| 43 || May 21 || 7:35p.m. PDT || Mariners || W 18–3 || || || || 3:18 || 20,295 || 23–20 || W2
|-

|- style="background:#cfc;"
| 63 || June 12 || || Padres || W 8–4 || || || || 3:11 || 22,164 || 34–29 || W1
|- style="background:#fcc;"
| 64 || June 13 || || Padres || L 7–8  || || || || 5:03 || 24,664 || 34–30 || L1
|- style="background:#fcc;"
| 65 || June 14 || 7:05p.m. PDT || Giants || L 3–10 || || || || 3:21 || 27,875 || 34–31 || L2
|- style="background:#fcc;"
| 66 || June 15 || 1:05p.m. PDT || Giants || L 1–4 || || || || 3:28 || 30,404 || 34–32 || L3
|- style="background:#fcc;"
| 67 || June 17 || 7:05p.m. PDT || @ Dodgers || L 3–4 || || || || 2:55 || 41,428 || 34–33 || L4
|- style="background:#fcc;"
| 68 || June 18 || 7:35p.m. PDT || @ Dodgers || L 5–7 || || || || 3:10 || 45,953 || 34–34 || L5
|- style="background:#fcc;"
| 76 || June 26 || 7:06p.m. PDT || @ Mariners || L 3–6 || || || || 2:51 || 31,248 || 40–36 || L2
|- style="background:#fcc;"
| 77 || June 27 || 7:07p.m. PDT || @ Mariners || L 1–8 || || || || 2:42 || 32,247 || 40–37 || L3
|- style="background:#cfc;"
| 78 || June 28 || 7:07p.m. PDT || @ Mariners || W 6–1 || || || || 2:46 || 38,750 || 41–37 || W1
|- style="background:#fcc;"
| 79 || June 29 || 1:35p.m. PDT || @ Mariners || L 2–3 || || || || 2:55 || 42,760 || 41–38 || L1
|- style="background:#fcc;"
| 80 || June 30 || 6:07p.m. PDT || @ Rockies || L 7–11 || || || || 3:32 || 48,359 || 41–39 || L2
|-

|- style="background:#cfc;"
| 81 || July 1 || 12:05p.m. PDT || @ Rockies || W 4–1 || || || || 2:53 || 48,235 || 42–39 || W1
|- style="background:#fcc;"
| 82 || July 2 || 7:36p.m. PDT || Dodgers || L 4–5 || || || || 3:38 || 34,507 || 42–40 || L1
|- style="background:#fcc;"
| 83 || July 3 || 7:05p.m. PDT || Dodgers || L 2–8 || || || || 3:33 || 35,295 || 42–41 || L2
|- style="background:#fcc;"
| 84 || July 4 || 7:08p.m. PDT || Mariners || L 3–7 || || || || 2:50 || 34,839 || 42–42 || L3
|- style="background:#cfc;"
| 85 || July 5 || 7:05p.m. PDT || Mariners || W 5–4 || || || || 3:17 || 26,301 || 43–42 || W1
|- style="background:#cfc;"
| 86 || July 6 || 5:06p.m. PDT || Mariners || W 8–0 || || || || 2:43 || 22,916 || 44–42 || W2
|- style=background:#bbbfff
|colspan="12"|68th All-Star Game in Cleveland, OH
|- style="background:#fcc;"
| 98 || July 22 || 4:35p.m. PDT || @ Yankees || L 2–9 || || || || 2:45 || 25,816 || 54–44 || L1
|- style="background:#fcc;"
| 99 || July 23 || 10:07a.m. PDT || @ Yankees || L 4–5 || || || || 3:07 || 26,750 || 54–45 || L2
|- style="background:#bbb;"
|–|| July 24 || || @ Yankees || colspan="8"|Postponed (Rain; Site change) (Makeup date: August 20)
|- style="background:#cfc;"
| 104  || July 28 || 1:05p.m. PDT || @ Indians || W 2–0 || || || || 2:37 || 43,033 || 57–47 || W1
|- style="background:#cfc;"
| 105  || July 28 || 4:06p.m. PDT || @ Indians || W 10–7 || || || || 4:00 || 42,857 || 58–47 || W2
|- style="background:#cfc;"
| 106 || July 29 || 4:05p.m. PDT || @ Indians || W 7–2 || || || || 2:31 || 42,975 || 59–47 || W3
|- style="background:#cfc;"
| 107 || July 30 || 4:36p.m. PDT || @ Indians || W 5–2 || || || || 3:09 || 42,898 || 60–47 || W4
|- style="background:#fcc;"
| 108 || July 31 || || White Sox
|-

|- style="background:#cfc;"
| 109 || August 1 || || White Sox
|- style="background:#cfc;"
| 110 || August 2 || || White Sox
|- style="background:#cfc;"
| 111 || August 3 || || White Sox
|- style="background:#fcc;"
| 115 || August 8 || 7:05p.m. PDT || Orioles || L 2–6 || || || || 3:10 || 24,944 || 65–50 || L1
|- style="background:#cfc;"
| 116 || August 9 || 7:05p.m. PDT || Orioles || W 4–3 || || || || 3:05 || 32,207 || 66–50 || 
W1
|- style="background:#fcc;"
| 117 || August 10 || 5:05p.m. PDT || Orioles || L 3–4 || || || || 3:33 || 34,060 || 66–51 || L1
|- style="background:#fcc;"
| 118 || August 12 || || @ White Sox
|- style="background:#fcc;"
| 119 || August 13 || || @ White Sox
|- style="background:#fcc;"
| 122 || August 16 || 4:07p.m. PDT || @ Orioles || L 9–10 || || || || 3:25 || 47,815 || 68–54 || L1
|- style="background:#fcc;"
| 123 || August 17 || 10:35a.m. PDT || @ Orioles || L 4–5  || || || || 3:47 || 47,340 || 68–55 || L2
|- style="background:#fcc;"
| 124 || August 18 || 4:35p.m. PDT || @ Orioles || L 1–2 || || || || 3:29 || 47,804 || 68–56 || L3
|- style="background:#cfc;"
| 125 || August 19 || 7:05p.m. PDT || Yankees || W 12–4 || || || || 3:00 || 22,596 || 69–56 || W1
|- style="background:#fcc;"
| 126  || August 20 || 4:05p.m. PDT || Yankees || L 3–7 || || || || 3:04 || || 69–57 || L1
|- style="background:#fcc;"
| 127  || August 20 || 7:50p.m. PDT || Yankees || L 5–8 || || || || 3:24 || 32,343 || 69–58 || L2
|- style="background:#fcc;"
| 128 || August 21 || 7:05p.m. PDT || Yankees || L 3–4  || || || || 4:11 || 27,102 || 69–59 || L3
|- style="background:#cfc;"
| 132 || August 26 || 7:05p.m. PDT || Indians || W 8–7 || || || || 3:07 || 21,012 || 72–60 || W1
|- style="background:#fcc;"
| 133 || August 27 || 7:35p.m. PDT || Indians || L 4–10 || || || || 3:03 || 20,140 || 72–61 || L1
|- style="background:#fcc;"
| 134 || August 28 || || @ Padres || L 2–9 || || || || 2:41 || 18,203 || 72–62 || L2
|- style="background:#cfc;"
| 135 || August 29 || || @ Padres || W 3–1 || || || || 2:37 || 60,230 || 73–62 || W1
|- style="background:#fcc;"
| 136 || August 30 || 1:08p.m. PDT || @ Giants || L 3–7 || || || || 2:43 || 26,200 || 73–63 || L1
|- style="background:#cfc;"
| 137 || August 31 || 1:07p.m. PDT || @ Giants || W 7–4 || || || || 3:15 || 24,751 || 74–63 || W1
|-

|- style="background:#fcc;"
| 138 || September 1 || 7:05p.m. PDT || Rockies || L 1–4 || || || || 2:55 || 19,614 || 74–64 || L1
|- style="background:#fcc;"
| 139 || September 2 || 7:05p.m. PDT || Rockies || L 2–7 || || || || 3:01 || 18,266 || 74–65 || L2
|- style="background:#fcc;"
| 157 || September 23 || 7:07p.m. PDT || @ Mariners || L 3–4 || || || || 3:01 || 52,884 || 82–75 || L1
|- style="background:#cfc;"
| 158 || September 24 || 7:36p.m. PDT || @ Mariners || W 9–3 || || || || 2:51 || 41,975 || 83–75 || W1
|-

|- style="text-align:center;"
| Legend:       = Win       = Loss       = PostponementBold = Angels team member

Player stats

Batting

Starters by position
Note: Pos = Position; G = Games played; AB = At bats; H = Hits; Avg. = Batting average; HR = Home runs; RBI = Runs batted in

Other batters
Note: G = Games played; AB = At bats; H = Hits; Avg. = Batting average; HR = Home runs; RBI = Runs batted in

Pitching

Starting pitchers 
Note: G = Games pitched; IP = Innings pitched; W = Wins; L = Losses; ERA = Earned run average; SO = Strikeouts

Other pitchers 
Note: G = Games pitched; IP = Innings pitched; W = Wins; L = Losses; ERA = Earned run average; SO = Strikeouts

Relief pitchers 
Note: G = Games pitched; W = Wins; L = Losses; SV = Saves; ERA = Earned run average; SO = Strikeouts

Farm system

References

1997 Anaheim Angels at Baseball Reference
1997 Anaheim Angels at Baseball Almanac

Los Angeles Angels seasons
Anaheim Angels season
Los